Jean Adelin De Boë (March 20, 1889 in Anderlecht (Brussels) – January 2, 1974 in Watermael-Boitsfort (Brussels)) was a typographer and anarchist.

References

1889 births
1974 deaths
Typographers and type designers
Belgian anarchists